Penstemon serrulatus is a species of penstemon known by the common names Cascade penstemon, coast penstemon, or serrulate penstemon. It is native to the Pacific Northwest of North America, from Oregon to Alaska.

Description
The leaves are lanceolate to ovate-oblong with sharply serrated edges. The inflorescence consists of clusters of tubular blue to purple flowers.

Penstemon serrulatus is one of the few penstemons to occur at low elevations along the Pacific Northwest coast and in the Puget Sound lowlands.

References

External links

serrulatus
Flora of the Northwestern United States
Flora of British Columbia
Flora of the Cascade Range
Flora without expected TNC conservation status